Various marine animals are capable of aerial locomotion, i.e., jumping out of the water and moving through air. Some possible reasons for this behavior are hunting, escaping from predators, and saving energy for swimming or breathing. Some of the jumping behaviors initiate gliding and taxiing in air, while some of them end up falling back to water.

Penetrating water surface
The speed of motion in air is faster than in water because of drag force. The drag force is proportional to density of the fluid. The animal jumping out of water will feel almost no drag, since the air density is 1,000 times less than water density. Usually animals gain thrust for the jumping as how they lift themselves underwater. Some of them are group behavior.

Mechanism

Jet propulsion
Jet propulsion generates thrust and momentum by shooting out water jets. Flying squid is known for their behavior of leaping out of the water. Ommastrephinae and Todarodinae are two subfamilies of squids under the family of Ommastrephidae. They utilize jet propulsion to jump out of water as they do underwater, including Japanese flying squid.., Humboldt squid, Neon flying squid, sevenstar flying squid, and Wellington flying squid. Squid flight may be thought to reduce the cost of migration. The acceleration of Sthenoteuthis pteropus in air is 265 body lengths/s2 (24.5 m/s2), which is found to exceed that in water (79 body lengths/s2).

Tail beating
The fish approach the water surface at high speed (about 10 m/s in large fish; 20-30 body lengths/s) with their lateral fins furled against the body. They get accelerated by beating their tails rapidly, and break through the water surface at a shallow angle to the horizontal. Four fish in ray-finned fish family (Beloniformes) and salmon have this jumping behavior. The ray-finned fish includes needlefish, flyingfish, halfbeak, and sauries. Salmon jump out waterfalls during upstream spawning migrations.

C-start
C-start is escape reflex employed by fish. The fish move upward by curving their slender body as a letter C. Most of the fish jump out of water by C-start. Freshwater butterflyfish jumps out of water by curving its body. The fish is known for its enlarged pectoral fins but it falls back to water instead of gliding. Freshwater hatchetfish exhibits a ballistic aerial path.

Porpoising
Porpoising is high-speed swimming close to water surface with many leaving and re-entering the water nose-first. Dolphin, Penguin, and Seal porpoise in the wild. Dolphin saves energy at high speed porpoising. Penguin porpoises in group for long-distance traveling. Seal porpoises as group play

Other
The mechanisms and jumping patterns of some aquatic animals are not clear. Mobula penetrates sea surface by many photo evidences. Great white shark attacks seals near water surface at Seal Island in South Africa

See also
Tradeoffs for locomotion in air and water
Flying and gliding animals
The Flying Mobulas of the Sea of Cortez

References

Animal locomotion